Séraphin Joseph Mottet(1861-1930) was a French horticulturalist, noted for being an expert on irises.

In 1927, Mottet was awarded by The British Iris Society, the Foster Memorial Plaque (named after Michael Foster).

References

French horticulturists
1861 births
1930 deaths